Trichobaris is a genus of flower weevils in the family Curculionidae. There are 8 to 13 species in genus Trichobaris.

These weevils feed on plants in the family Solanaceae, including cultivated plants such as tomato, potato, and tobacco. They likely evolved in association with plants of genus Datura.

Species
Species include:
 Trichobaris bridwelli Barber, 1935
 Trichobaris championi Barber, 1935
 Trichobaris compacta Casey, 1892 (Datura weevil)
 Trichobaris cylindrica Casey, 1892
 Trichobaris insolita Casey, 1892
 Trichobaris major Barber, 1935
 Trichobaris mucorea (LeConte, 1858) (tobacco stalk borer)
 Trichobaris pellicea (Boheman, 1844)
 Trichobaris pueblana Casey, 1920
 Trichobaris trinotata (Say, 1832) (potato stalk borer)
 Trichobaris vestita (Boheman, 1836)

Notes

References

 Alonso-Zarazaga, Miguel A., and Christopher H. C. Lyal (1999). A World Catalogue of Families and Genera of Curculionoidea (Insecta: Coleoptera) (Excepting Scotylidae and Platypodidae), 315.
 Poole, Robert W., and Patricia Gentili, eds. (1996). "Coleoptera". Nomina Insecta Nearctica: A Check List of the Insects of North America, vol. 1: Coleoptera, Strepsiptera, 41-820.

Further reading

 Arnett, R. H. Jr., M. C. Thomas, P. E. Skelley and J. H. Frank. (eds.). (21 June 2002). American Beetles, Volume II: Polyphaga: Scarabaeoidea through Curculionoidea. CRC Press LLC, Boca Raton, Florida .
 
 Richard E. White. (1983). Peterson Field Guides: Beetles. Houghton Mifflin Company.

External links

 NCBI Taxonomy Browser, Trichobaris

Baridinae
Curculionidae genera